Hebestola nebulosa is a species of beetle in the family Cerambycidae, and the only species in the genus Hebestola. It was described by Haldeman in 1847.

References

Lamiini
Beetles described in 1847